Sutton and Cheam is a constituency represented in the House of Commons of the UK Parliament since 2015 by Paul Scully, a Conservative.

Political history 
The area's voters produced a 32.6% swing to the Liberal Party in the 1972 by-election. In the nine prior elections it only returned Conservative MPs and the Liberal candidate polled third behind Labour six times and none stood three times.

The seat is a marginal seat which has since 1970 frequently flipped between electing Conservative and Liberal/Liberal Democrat candidates. During the Conservative Government 1979-1990, the seat was won by a sufficient majority to be branded a Conservative safe seat. It was regained by the Liberal Democrats in the 1997 general election. The Conservatives regained the seat at the 2015 general election. In June 2016, an estimated 51.28% of local adults voting in the EU membership referendum chose to leave the European Union instead of to remain. This was matched in two January 2018 votes in Parliament by its MP.

At the 2017 general election, the incumbent Conservative MP, Paul Scully, gained an 8.3% swing which moved the seat away from the typical "marginal" band of analysis: Scully won by a 24.4% majority. Due to the secret ballot only opinion polls can determine if this rise in popularity had more to do with the campaign of the Liberal Democrat candidate and/or the Conservatives picking up votes from the non-standing party UKIP, whose withdrawal was common in 2017 nationwide, following the vote to leave the EU. UKIP had 378 candidates across the UK, 346 fewer than in 2015. Also not standing, and having lost their deposits in 2015, were two left-wing minor candidates. An 11.6% extra vote share was on hand for four parties as the candidate list fell from seven to four.

The seat had ranked from 2015 to 2017 the 39th-slimmest margin of majority, specifically in share of the vote as opposed to number of votes, among the 331 Conservative seats. In third place, Labour's vote share almost doubled to 20.4%, their highest in Sutton and Cheam since 1970; a further swing of 3.4% of voters would have made Labour the closest challengers to the Conservatives, before the Liberal Democrats. The Conservatives finished in fourth place in the European Election 2019, trailing significantly behind the Liberal Democrats, the Brexit Party, and the Labour Party.

Prominent members 
Richard Sharples, the constituency's Conservative MP from 1954, was a former major in the army, and served as a Home Office Minister, before resigning his seat in 1972 to become Governor of Bermuda.

Boundaries

1945–1950: The Municipal Borough of Sutton and Cheam.

1950–1964: as above (from 1965 becoming wards of the London Borough of Sutton but not described as such in boundary legislation itself for a time).

1964–1978: The London Borough of Sutton wards of Belmont, Cheam North, Cheam South, Cheam West, Sutton Central, Sutton East, Sutton North, Sutton North East, Sutton South, Sutton South East, Worcester Park North, and Worcester Park South.

1978–2002: The London Borough of Sutton wards of Belmont, Cheam South, Cheam West, North Cheam, Rosehill, Sutton Central, Sutton Common, Sutton East, Sutton South, Sutton West, Worcester Park North, and Worcester Park South.

2002–present: The London Borough of Sutton wards of Belmont, Cheam, Nonsuch, Stonecot, Sutton Central, Sutton North, Sutton South, Sutton West, and Worcester Park.

Constituency profile
The area maintains separate schooling systems, with grammar schools and comprehensive schools, similar to Kingston upon Thames; it has more semi-detached, terraced and detached properties than the Greater London average.

Workless claimants, registered jobseekers, were in November 2012 significantly lower than the national average of 3.8%, at 2.1% of the population based on a statistical compilation by The Guardian.

Members of Parliament

Elections

Elections in the 2010s

Elections in the 2000s

Elections in the 1990s

Elections in the 1980s

Elections in the 1970s

Elections in the 1960s

Elections in the 1950s

Elections in the 1940s

See also 
 List of parliamentary constituencies in London

Notes

References

External links 
Politics Resources (Election results from 1922 onwards)
Electoral Calculus (Election results from 1955 onwards)

Politics of the London Borough of Sutton
Parliamentary constituencies in London
Constituencies of the Parliament of the United Kingdom established in 1945
Sutton, London